is a Japanese composer and arranger. She has composed the music for a number of anime series, including Toradora!, Omamori Himari, Mayo Chiki!, Kanamemo, MM!, Penguindrum, Yurikuma Arashi, Sankarea: Undying Love, Golden Time, If Her Flag Breaks, Mr. Osomatsu, March Comes in Like a Lion, Sarazanmai,Komi Can't Communicate, and the closing theme "Kanashii Yokan" to Tsukuyomi: Moon Phase.

Collaborations with Yukari Tamura include arranging some tracks on the album Gin no Senritsu, Kioku no Mizuoto.. She composed and arranged the music for the song "Cutie ♥ Cutie" on Yukari Tamura's single Spiritual Garden and the track Princess Rose. She also composed and arranged the music of "Spring Fever" on the album Kohaku no Uta, Hitohira and "Princess Rose" on the album Sincerely Dears....

She also composed 2 tracks from the drama CD ""The Matinée of the Palace" Chapter.3 ~Unspeakable Lines~" from Tsubasa: Reservoir Chronicle.

References

External links

Yukari Hashimoto anime at Media Arts Database 

1966 births
Anime composers
Japanese composers
Japanese women composers
Japanese music arrangers
Living people